Sir Andrew Moray, Lord of Petty (died 8 April 1298) was Justiciar of Scotia.

Life
Andrew Moray was the younger son of Sir Walter de Moray, and a daughter of Sir Walter Olifard of Bothwell who was the son of Sir David Olifard of Bothwell. He and his son were amongst the Scottish noblemen captured following the Battle of Dunbar in 1296. Moray was imprisoned in the Tower of London, where he died on 8 April 1298.

Marriage and issue
According to Andrew of Wyntoun, Sir Andrew Moray married a daughter of John I Comyn, Lord of Badenoch, and had issue:

Andrew Moray (dow following the Battle of Stirling Bridge, 1297)

Moray married secondly Euphemia, widow of William Comyn of Kilbride, daughter of Roger FitzJohn and Isabel de Dunbar.

William de Moray of Drumsagard

References

Notes

Sources
 Barrow, G.W.S. "Robert Bruce and the Community of the Realm", Fourth Edition, 2005;
The Original Chronicle of Andrew of Wyntoun ed. F.J. Amours. vol v, Edinburgh 1907.
Balfour Paul, Sir James, Scots Peerage ix vols, Edinburgh 1904.

1298 deaths
Scottish knights
Scottish rebels
Scottish generals
Scottish Roman Catholics
People of the Wars of Scottish Independence
Prisoners in the Tower of London
People from Ross and Cromarty
Year of birth unknown
Andrew